Silbert is a surname. Notable people with the surname include:

 Adolphe Silbert, French chess master
 Earl J. Silbert (born 1936), American lawyer
 Harvey Silbert (1912–2002), American entertainment lawyer, casino executive and philanthropist
 Leslie Silbert, American novelist
 Maria Silbert (1866–1936), Austrian spiritualist medium
 Mimi Silbert (born 1942), American philanthropist
 Ryan Silbert, filmmaker